The Vorab is a mountain of the Glarus Alps, located on the border between the cantons of Glarus and Graubünden. The summit (3,028 metres) is also named Bündner Vorab to distinguish it from a lower summit (3,018 metres) named Glarner Vorab. A glacier runs down its eastern face where the valley continues a moderate inclination down towards Flims, where it can be seen for example from Caumasee. It cannot be seen from the adjacent municipalities on the south though. The northwestern face however consists of a sheer drop towards Elm.

Territorially it divides on the municipal areas of Laax on its eastern face, a narrow southern stripe within Siat and Elm on its northwestern face. The secondary peaks that belong to the massive include also the municipalities of Ruschein and Panix.

Since 1979 there is a terminal station of a platter lift near the Glarner Vorab. This comes up from the terminal station of a gondola lift ending at the edge of the glacier, all of these installations belonging to the skiing resort of Flims-Laax-Falera  which uses the name of Laax only for winter marketing.

See also
Vorab Glacier

References

External links

Vorab on Hikr

Mountains of Switzerland
Mountains of the canton of Glarus
Mountains of Graubünden
Glarus–Graubünden border
Mountains of the Alps
Laax